The Libyan records in swimming are the fastest ever performances of swimmers from Libya, which are recognised and ratified by the Libyan Swimming Federation.

All records were set in finals unless noted otherwise.

Long Course (50 m)

Men

Women

Short Course (25 m)

Men

Women

References

Libya
Records
Swimming